King Edward VI Camp Hill School for Boys is a highly selective grammar school in Birmingham, United Kingdom. It is one of the most academically successful schools in the United Kingdom, currently ranked third among state schools. The name is retained from the previous location at Camp Hill in central Birmingham. The school moved to Vicarage Road in the suburb of Kings Heath in 1956, sharing a campus with its sister school (King Edward VI Camp Hill School for Girls), also formerly located in Camp Hill. It is a school which specialises in Science, Mathematics, and Applied Learning. In 2006, the school was assessed by The Sunday Times as state school of the year. A Year 9 student was 2011 winner of  The Guardian Children's Fiction Page and the Gold Award in the British Physics Olympiad was won by a King Edward VI Camp Hill student in September 2011. Camp Hill has also sent a boy to the International Chemistry Olympiad for 4 years in a row (2019, 2018, 2017, 2018 2016). In the 2019 Chemistry Olympiad, Camp Hill received the second most gold certificates, coming second to St Paul's School, London.

Ofsted inspections classify Camp Hill as an Outstanding Provider.

History

The school was founded in January 1883 and operated for two terms on the New Street site of King Edward's School. It opened at its intended site at Camp Hill in Birmingham, near the city centre in September 1883, and moved to its current location, adjacent to Kings Heath Park, in 1956. Camp Hill Boys celebrated its 50-year jubilee in 2007 with a concert at Symphony Hall and the burial of a time capsule to be opened in another 50 years' time. It celebrated its House Centenary in 2007–8, with special events throughout the year that are not normally part of the house competition e.g. 5-a-side football.

Admission

Admission to Camp Hill is based upon success in the 11+ exam along with consideration of proximity to the school. It is also guaranteed that at least 25% of students admitted will be "Pupil Premium Pupils", which are pupils whose families will have received free school meals at some point in the six years prior to application. Those living outside the catchment are able to attend Camp Hill, but only if they achieve a very high score in the 11+, and the quota for catchment pupils is not filled. This admissions policy replaced the previous one for admissions starting in 2020. Previously, no weight was attached to proximity to the school, and the quota for Pupil Premium Pupils was 20%.

Admissions controversy 2020
For the academic year starting in 2020, changes were made to admissions criteria by the Foundation of the Schools of King Edward VI, the body which oversees the running of Camp Hill and the other King Edward schools in Birmingham. These changes were praised by some but proved controversial, with only 27% of those consulted supporting the plans. The changes increased admissions of Pupil Premium students to 25%, and due to the implementation of new catchment areas, admissions were restricted almost exclusively to a small area of city wards surrounding the school. Previously, applications were open to any UK citizen. In public consultation, many concerns were raised about the catchment areas, including that they may be designed to increase applications to the private school of King Edward's School in Edgbaston, overseen by the same body, and that students from the wider West Midlands county, in areas such as Solihull, would find it near impossible to gain entry if not part of the Pupil Premium quota. These concerns were brushed aside by the Schools of King Edward VI, which explained them as affluent parents outside Birmingham being disappointed at their loss of entitlement to a grammar school place. The BBC and others published articles on the changes, but all largely ignored the concerns about the catchment area, focussing instead on the issue of increased admission of deprived pupils, and the perceived class struggle. Additionally, the 11+ entry score, which used to be different for each grammar school (with Camp Hill having the highest entry score) was lowered and made the same for every King Edward VI grammar school in Birmingham, which many say is a way of decreasing the school's quality. In a FOI request to The King Edward Schools, release of the consultation responses, and information regarding reasons for the catchment plans, was refused. A complaint regarding conflicts of interest and concerns raised in the consultation was also brushed aside.

Specialist status

The school has been granted Specialist College status in three specialisms: Science (including Maths), Humanities and Applied Learning.

Sports

The sports played at Camp Hill are seasonal: rugby and hockey in the Winter term and Spring term; in the Summer term: cricket and athletics are the main sports. Other sports include basketball, fitness, gymnastics, and tennis. Sixth form students may play football during games periods, and seniors (Years 11–13) especially the sixth form have the opportunity to play a wide variety of sports, including football, hockey, rugby, cricket, athletics, basketball, badminton, volleyball, table tennis, swimming, squash and tennis.  All students are required to take part in certain house events (known as Standards) - cross-country, swimming and athletics. Other off-curriculum sports include fencing, swimming, and rugby and cricket training after school.

Notable alumni

 Stanley Barnes, neurologist, former Dean from 1931-42 of the University of Birmingham Medical School, and fourth President from 1931-2 of the Association of British Neurologists
 Mark Billingham, author, crime fiction
 Keith Campbell member of the team that cloned Dolly the sheep
 Fintan Coyle, co-creator of TV gameshow "Weakest Link"
 Roger Cotterrell, Anniversary Professor of Legal Theory since 2005 at Queen Mary, University of London
 Alan Dedicoat, BBC announcer and newsreader
 Reginald Eyre, Conservative MP for Birmingham Hall Green from 1965–87 and Chairman of the Birmingham Heartlands Development Corporation from 1987–98
 Clifford Grey (real name Percival Davis), composer who wrote If You Were the Only Girl (In the World), and won Olympic gold medals in 1928 and 1932 for the USA bobsleigh team
 Nicholas Green (judge) QC, High Court Judge, Queen's Bench Division 2013, UK Permanent Representative to the Council of Bars and Law Societies of Europe from 2000-2 and Vice-Chairman of the Bar Council of England and Wales 
 Robin Grimes, materials scientist, Foreign Secretary to the Royal Society
 Frank Heaven
 Harry Jephcott, President of the Royal Institute of Chemistry from 1953–5, and Chairman of Glaxo Group from 1950–64y
 John Light, actor.
 Richard Mottram GCB, former Permanent Secretary in the UK civil service, and Chairman of Amey plc since 2008
 Charles Talbut Onions CBE, lexicographer, contributed to the history of the Oxford English Dictionary
 Ronald Pearsall, author
 Robert Pickard, Vice-Chancellor of the University of London from 1937–9, Director of the British Cotton Industry Research Association from 1927–43, and President of the Royal Institute of Chemistry from 1936–9
 Edward William Salt, Conservative MP for Birmingham Yardley from 1931–45
 Dave Wakeling, singer and songwriter, founder of ska band The Beat
 David Wheeler, helped invent the subroutine and some encryption algorithms, and Professor of Computer Science at the University of Cambridge from 1978–94
 Frank Wilson, Merton Professor of English Literature at the University of Oxford from 1947–57, President of the Malone Society from 1960-3 and the Bibliographical Society from 1950-2
 Conor Woodman, broadcaster and author.

References

External links
 Camp Hill Boys official website
 Edubase (Boys)

Grammar schools in Birmingham, West Midlands
Educational institutions established in 1883
Boys' schools in the West Midlands (county)
1883 establishments in England
Academies in Birmingham, West Midlands